Kristen Cloutier is an American politician from Lewiston, Maine. She currently serves as a state representative.

Maine House of Representatives 
On November 6, 2018, Cloutier was elected to the Maine House of Representatives representing part of Lewiston. She succeeded Jared Golden, who was elected to Congress. She is a member of the Democratic Party.

Lewiston City Council and Mayor
Cloutier was elected to the Lewiston City Council from Ward 5 in 2013. She became City Council President following the 2015 elections, making her first in line to succeed the incumbent mayor. After incumbent mayor Shane Bouchard resigned on March 8, 2019, following allegations of an extramarital affair, illegal conduct and racism, Cloutier became mayor of Lewiston, serving until January 6, 2020, when Mark Cayer, the winner of the 2019 mayoral election, was sworn in.

References

Year of birth missing (living people)
Living people
Women mayors of places in Maine
Democratic Party members of the Maine House of Representatives
Lewiston, Maine City Council members
Women city councillors in Maine
21st-century American politicians
21st-century American women politicians
Women state legislators in Maine